The Second Battle of Cobadin was a battle fought from 19 to 25 October 1916 between the Central Powers, chiefly the Bulgarian Third Army, and the Entente, represented by the Russo–Romanian  Dobruja Army. The battle ended in a decisive victory for the Central Powers; it resulted in the occupation of the strategic port of Constanța and the capture of the railway between that city and Cernavodă.

Aftermath

Battle of the Danube Delta
Despite the loss of most of Dobruja to the Central Powers, the Romanian defensive victory at Tulcea in January 1917, combined with the actions of the Romanian cruiser Elisabeta at the mouths of the Danube, ensured Romanian control over the entire Danube Delta throughout the rest of the War.

See also
First Battle of Cobadin

References

Sources

 
 
 
 

Battles of World War I involving Romania
Battles of World War I involving Germany
Battles of World War I involving Bulgaria
Battles of World War I involving the Ottoman Empire
Battles of World War I involving Russia
Battles of the Balkans Theatre (World War I)
History of Dobruja
Conflicts in 1916
1916 in Bulgaria
1916 in Romania
Naval battles involving Romania
October 1916 events